Thomas Hodge may refer to:
 Thomas Hodge (governor), British colonial governor
 Thomas Hodge (illustrator), English golf illustrator and painter.
 Thomas Hodge (Garibaldian), English supporter of Giuseppe Garibaldi

See also
 Thomas Hodges (disambiguation)